The 2000 Junior League World Series took place from August 14–19 in Taylor, Michigan, United States. Aiea, Hawaii defeated Langley, Canada in the championship game.

Teams

Results

References

Junior League World Series
Junior League World Series